Eric Nash Devenport (3 May 1926 – 10 November 2012) was Bishop of Dunwich from 1980 to 1992.

Devenport was born in Burslem, Stoke-on-Trent. He attended the Lichfield Cathedral choir school until the family moved to Durham. His training at Kelham Hall theological college was interrupted by National Service in the Royal Navy. He was also educated at the Open University. After ordination he held curacies at St Mark's Church, Leicester and  St Matthew, Barrow-in-Furness. Following this he was Succentor at  Leicester Cathedral, then Vicar of Shepshed and finally (before his ordination to the episcopate)  Leader of Mission for the Diocese of Leicester. He resigned in 1992 and  became Archdeacon of Italy and Malta and Chaplain of St Mark's, Florence, a post he held for five years.

In retirement he was an assistant bishop in the Norwich Diocese until his death in 2012.

References

1926 births
2012 deaths
Alumni of the Open University
Bishops of Dunwich
20th-century Church of England bishops
Archdeacons of Italy and Malta